The football (soccer) Campeonato Brasileiro Série B 2003, the second level of Brazilian National League, was played from April 25 to November 29, 2003. The competition had 24 clubs and two of them were promoted to Série A and two were relegated to Série C.

In the first round, each team played against each other, much like what happens in Série A. However, in contrast to Série A, each team played against the other only once. Therefore, each team played 23 games, 12 home and 11 away (or the opposite). The eight best ranked teams advanced to the second round, where they were divided in two groups of four. Teams in each group played against each other home and away. The two best ranked teams in each group advanced to the final round. Those four teams were put in a single group, and played against each other home and away.

Palmeiras finished the final phase group with most points and was declared 2003 Brazilian Série B champions, claiming the promotion to the 2004 Série A along with Botafogo, the runners-up. The two worst ranked teams in the first round (Gama and União São João) were relegated to play Série C in 2004.

Teams

First stage

Second stage

Group A

Group B

Final stage

Notes

Sources

 

2003 in Brazilian football leagues
Campeonato Brasileiro Série B seasons